Bethea is a surname. Notable people with the surname include:
Antoine Bethea (born 1984), professional American football safety
Bill Bethea (born 1942), American college baseball coach
Elvin Bethea (born 1946), former American football defensive end
Erin Bethea (born 1982), American actress
James Bethea (born 1965), American producer and television performer
Larry Bethea (1956–1987), American football defensive lineman
Preston Lang Bethea (1870–1944), American politician
Rainey Bethea (1909–1936), the last person to be publicly executed in the United States
Ryan Bethea (born 1967), American football player
Solomon H. Bethea (1852–1909), United States federal judge

See also
Tristram Bethea House, also known as Pleasant Ridge, is a historic plantation house near Camden, Alabama